is a 2019 Japanese animated action fantasy film based on the Pretty Cure franchise created by Izumi Todo, and its sixteenth series, Star Twinkle PreCure. The film is directed by Yuta Tanaka, written by Jin Tanaka, and produced by Toei Animation. The film was released in Japan on October 19, 2019.

In the film, Hikaru and Lala befriend an Unidentified Mysterious Animal (UMA), and goes on an adventure around the world.

Plot
In space, Cures Star, Milky, Soleil, Selene and Cosmo battle Tengu and the Notrei army. During the battle, the meteor shower approaches, Milky commands Prunce to move her ship while getting hit by a star drop. A police detective Mary Anne arrives and assists the Cures, forcing Tengu to escape. As Mary Anne tries to arrest Cosmo, she escape with Milky's rocket.

Next morning at Hikaru's house, the star drop that fell on Lala is shown to be alive. It grows an antenna and a body and transports them to Okinawa after hearing Hikaru's wish. With joy and excitement, Hikaru decides to name the creature UMA (Unidentified Mysterious Animal). Elena and Madoka, who are also currently spending their time on Okinawa on vacation, are surprised by Hikaru's abrupt appearance. Lala briefly argues with UMA, which it cries after, and Lala hums a tune to calm it down. After Elena and Madoka meets UMA for the first time, Hikaru and the others travel to various places around the world. Meanwhile, Mary Anne halts her pursuit to Yuni, whom realizes that a group of alien hunters are heading towards Earth.

The Hunters: Gyro III, Hydro, Burn, Dive and Chop lands on Earth and demands Hikaru and Lala to hand over UMA, where Elena, Madoka and Yuni arrives to aid the duo, transforms and fight. After being overwhelmed by the Hunters, Fuwa uses the power of the Miracle Light, which allows the Cures to use the power of the Star Princesses. After capturing the Hunters, Mary Anne explains that she has to take UMA as well, which Lala refuses. As Burn breaks himself free and snatches UMA, in which adding to Lala's yelling and crying, ends up becoming unstable by enlarging its size similar to Earth.

Desperate to stop and plead UMA from going berserk, the Cures make their way to it while facing various groups of new Hunters. Milky expresses her regret by not letting UMA go, and her and Star sings a song to UMA, with Soleil, Selene and Cosmo joining in. With UMA restored, it creates a new planet, while fully figured UMA bids Star and Milky goodbye.

In the credits, Mary Anne successfully captures all of the Hunters and leaves Earth, while Hikaru and Lala assures each other that they'll meet UMA again someday.

Voice cast
Eimi Naruse as Hikaru Hoshina/Cure Star
Konomi Kohara as Lala Hagoromo/Cure Milky
Kiyono Yasuno as Elena Amamiyama/Cure Soleil
Mikako Komatsu as Madoka Kaguya/Cure Selene
Sumire Uesaka as Yuni/Cure Cosmo
Hina Kino as Fuwa
Hiroyuki Yoshino as Prunce
Rina Chinen as Mary Anne
Takayuki Hamatsu as Gyro III
Yui Ishikawa as Hydro
Shunsuke Sakuya as Burn
Jin Katagiri as Dive
Ryūsuke Komakine as Chop

Aya Endō briefly voices Tenjou in the beginning of the film. Newscaster Takehiko Ueda also made cameo appearance as himself.

Production
In June 2019, it was announced that a standalone film for Star Twinkle PreCure was in development, with Yuta Tanaka and Jin Tanaka as director and screenwriter respectively, whom both previously worked on the Go! Princess PreCure series and Witchy Pretty Cure! The Movie: Wonderous! Cure Mofurun! film. In September 2019, it was announced that Takayuki Hamatsu, Yui Ishikawa, Shunsuke Sakuya, Jin Katagiri and Ryūsuke Komakine were cast as UMA hunters: Gyro III, Hydro, Burn, Dive and Chop respectively.
The film also featured newscaster Takehiko Ueda cameo as himself.

The film features two versions of the song, titled "Twinkle Stars". The first version will be used as an insert song, sung by the voice actresses of Star Twinkle PreCure, while the second version is used as an ending song, sung by Rina Chinen, who voices Mary Anne in the film.

Release
The film was released in theaters in Japan on October 19, 2019.

Reception

Box office
The film dropped from 6th to 7th place out of top 10 in the Japanese box office in its third week, and later dropped off the top 10 list in its fourth week.

References

External links
 

2010s Japanese films
2019 anime films
Pretty Cure films
Toei Animation films
Japanese magical girl films
Supernatural science fiction films
Films scored by Yuki Hayashi
Films set in outer space